The electoral district of Gippsland West was an electoral district of the Legislative Assembly in the Australian state of Victoria. 
It was created by the Electoral Act Amendment Act 1888 along with Gippsland Central and 
Gippsland East. Gippsland North and Gippsland South were resized at the same time. The electorate was dissolved in 2002.

The principal towns of Gippsland West included Pakenham, Drouin, Warragul and Trafalgar.

Members for Gippsland West

Election results

References

Former electoral districts of Victoria (Australia)
1889 establishments in Australia
1976 disestablishments in Australia
1985 establishments in Australia
2002 disestablishments in Australia
Gippsland (region)